INS Balshil is a Bhim-class tugboat currently in service with the Indian Navy. The ship was delivered to the Indian Navy ahead of schedule. INS Balshil enhances the capability of the yard in berthing bigger ships of the Indian Navy. The tugboat also has capacity to carry cargo.

See  also
 Tugboats of the Indian Navy

References 
 Sainik Samachar - Balshil joins Navy - Retrieved on 2009-04-27.
 Bhim class at Bharat-Rakshak - Retrieved on 2009-05-05.

2004 ships
Balshil
Tugs of the Indian Navy